Janko Veselinović is the name of:
Janko Veselinović (writer) (1862-1905)
Janko Veselinović (lawyer) (born 1965)